Red Banks may refer to the following places in the United States:

Red Banks, Kentucky, a former name of Henderson
Red Banks, Mississippi, an unincorporated community
Red Banks, North Carolina, an unincorporated community
Red Banks, Brown County, Wisconsin,  an unincorporated community
Red Banks, Waupaca County, Wisconsin, an unincorporated community
Red Banks Primitive Baptist Church, in North Carolina
Red Banks, Virginia, a ghost town

See also
Red Bank (disambiguation)
Redbank (disambiguation)